A list of books and essays about Powell & Pressburger:

Powell